On 16 June 2015, a collision took place between a train and a lorry, in El Fahs, Tunisia, resulting in 19 deaths and 98 injuries. The main cause of the accident was the lack of a barrier at the level crossing.

References

2015 in Tunisia
Railway accidents in 2015
Railway accidents and incidents in Tunisia
Level crossing incidents in Africa
2015 disasters in Tunisia